Banna Peak is a peak,  high, that surmounts the south end of Banna Ridge in the northwest part of the Britannia Range of mountains in Antarctica. It was named in association with Britannia by a University of Waikato (New Zealand) geological party led by Michael Selby, 1978–79. Banna is a historical placename formerly used in Roman Britain; it was a fort on Hadrian's Wall.

References
 

Mountains of Oates Land